Sorhagenia janiszewskae is a moth in the family Cosmopterigidae. It is found from Great Britain to Russia and from Fennoscandia to France, Switzerland, Austria, Croatia, Hungary and Romania. It has also been reported from Portugal, the Caucasus and western Transcaucasia.

The wingspan is 8–11 mm. Adults are on wing from mid June to August in one generation per year.

The larvae feed on Rhamnus fragula and sometimes also Rhamnus cathartica. They mine the stem of young twigs and feed on the soft core up to the woody part. Part of the frass is ejected out of the mine through a hole in the side of the mine. Pupation takes place in a light spinning just above the ground. Larvae can be found from May to June.

References

External links
lepiforum.de

Moths described in 1962
Chrysopeleiinae
Moths of Europe